The 1877 Iquique earthquake occurred at 21:16 local time on 9 May (0:59 on 10 May UTC). It had a magnitude of 8.5 on the surface wave magnitude scale. Other estimates of its magnitude have been as high as 8.9  and 9.0  (based on the size of the tsunami). It had a maximum intensity of XI (Extreme) on the Mercalli intensity scale and triggered a devastating tsunami. A total of 2,385 people died, mainly in Fiji.

Historical context
Affected areas in what was then part of Bolivia, but is now the Antofagasta region of Chile, had during this period been subject to the Atacama border dispute between the two countries.  Under the 1874 boundary treaty between Bolivia and Chile, the border between the two nations as of 1877 followed the 24th parallel south.  The terms of that treaty required that Bolivia not levy taxes on Chilean companies mining nitrates between the 23rd and 24th parallels (including the city of Antofagasta) for 25 years, except for agreed duties to be shared between the two countries.

Following extensive damage in the 1877 earthquake and tsunami, the municipal authorities in Antofagasta voted for a tax of 10 centavos per quintal (approximately ) of nitrates exported to fund reconstruction of the town. The Chilean Antofagasta Nitrate & Railway Company, a major nitrate mining company in the region, refused to pay, backed by the Chilean government.  This dispute resulted in the War of the Pacific, fought from 1879 to 1884, by which Chile gained control of territory as far north as Tacna, including Bolivia's entire coastline.

Tectonic setting
Coastal regions of Peru and Chile lie above the convergent boundary, where the Nazca Plate is being subducted beneath the South American Plate along the line of the Peru–Chile Trench. This boundary has been the site of many great megathrust earthquakes, in addition to events caused by faulting within both the subducting and over-riding plates.

Damage
The earthquake shaking caused significant damage over most of the coastal parts of the Tarapacá and Antofagasta Regions. At Arica the water reached the cathedral. The hulk of the U.S. gunboat Wateree, which had been beached hundreds of metres inland by the final wave of the tsunami triggered by the 1868 Arica earthquake, was moved several kilometres to the north along the coast and nearer the shoreline. The tsunami caused 2,000 deaths in Fiji, and another 5 in Hilo, Hawaii.

Characteristics

Earthquake

Tsunami
The tsunami affected the coasts of Peru and northern Chile and was observed across the Pacific Ocean, in Australia, New Zealand, Samoa, Tonga, Fiji, Hawaii, Mexico, California and Japan. At Arica eight separate large waves were recorded.

Future earthquake hazard
The rupture area of the 1877 earthquake has been recognised as one of the major seismic gaps on the plate boundary, known as the "Northern Chile Seismic Gap". The  = 7.7 2007 Tocopilla earthquake occurred at the southern edge of the gap, but is not considered to have necessarily reduced the risk of a great megathrust earthquake within this area. In 2005, a recurrence period of 135 years was estimated for great earthquakes along this part of the plate boundary, suggesting that a similar earthquake to the 1877 event was likely in the early 21st century. The 2014 Iquique earthquake struck in the same seismic gap with a magnitude of  = 8.2.

See also
 1868 Arica earthquake
 List of earthquakes in Chile
 List of historical earthquakes
 List of tsunamis
 List of megathrust earthquakes

References

Further reading
 

Iquique
Megathrust earthquakes in Chile
Megathrust earthquakes in Peru
Earthquakes in Bolivia
Iquique
Iquique
Iquique
1877 tsunamis
Tsunamis in Japan
Tsunamis in New Zealand
History of Antofagasta Region
History of Tarapacá Region
Iquique Province
Tsunamis in Australia
May 1877 events
Tsunamis in Fiji
1877 disasters in South America
1877 disasters in Oceania
Earthquakes in Fiji
19th-century disasters in Fiji